The Wyra River is one of the tributaries of Munneru River, which is itself a major tributary of Krishna river. It originates at Wyra Reservoir near Wyra village, which was named after the reservoir.

Origins 
The river originates in Wyra reservoir at an elevation of 27 metres. It passes through Madhira. This rivulet drains into Munneru River after 65 kilometres of its journey.

Wyra Reservoir 
A reservoir was constructed across the lake Wyra in 1930 by Irrigation department of Andhra Pradesh and was inaugurated by Dr.Sarvepalli Radhakrishnan former President of India. It has a capacity of 3TMCs and can irrigate about 17,391 acres of land. The length of the dam is 1768.3 metres with 26 metres altitude at its foundation. There are 5 spillway gates for the dam. This lake was well known for fishing and sightseeing. Many industries were set up around this reservoir.

References 

Tributaries of the Krishna River
Rivers of Andhra Pradesh
Rivers of Telangana
Rivers of India